Silene diclinis is a species of plant in the family Caryophyllaceae. It is endemic to Spain.  Its natural habitat is pastureland. It is threatened by habitat loss.

It is dioecious, with separate male and female plants. It forms a clade with several other species that are dioecious.

References

diclinis
Endemic flora of Spain
Endemic flora of the Iberian Peninsula
Endangered plants
Taxonomy articles created by Polbot
Dioecious plants